The men's 100 metre freestyle competition of the swimming events at the 1983 Pan American Games took place on 19 August. The last Pan American Games champion was David McCagg of US.

This race consisted of two lengths of the pool, both lengths being in freestyle.

Results
All times are in minutes and seconds.

Heats
The first round was held on August 19.

Final 
The final was held on August 19.

References

Swimming at the 1983 Pan American Games